Jing Wu Men (Cantonese: Ching Mou Mun) may refer to:

Chin Woo Athletic Association, a Chinese martial arts school founded by Huo Yuanjia
Fist of Fury, a 1972 film starring Bruce Lee
Fist of Fury 1991, a 1991 film starring Stephen Chow
Fist of Fury (TV series), a 1995 TV series starring Donnie Yen